Capo Spartivento Lighthouse is an active lighthouse located on Cape Spartivento promontory which is the southernmost point of Sardinia and represents the eastern boundary of the Gulf of Teulada and the western limit of the Gulf of Cagliari on the Tyrrhenian Sea. The structure is situated in the municipality of Domus de Maria.

Description
The building, painted in red with white trim, was in poor condition and was restored in 2006 and transformed into a luxury resort, with four suites and swimming pool, as the adjacent building. The tower is painted white and the lantern, which mounts a Type OR T3 optics with a Focal length of 125mm, in grey metallic. The lighthouse is completely automated and managed by the Marina Militare with the identification code number 1310 E.F.

See also
 List of lighthouses in Italy
 Cape Spartivento

References

External links

 Servizio Fari Marina Militare
 Faro Capo Spartivento

Lighthouses in Italy
Buildings and structures in Sardinia